Hubei cuisine, also known as Chu cuisine or E cuisine, is derived from the native cooking styles of Hubei Province in China.

History
Hubei cuisine has a history of more than 2,000 years. The names of dishes and cuisine styles can be found in ancient literature such as Chuci of Qu Yuan.

Ingredients
As Hubei has plenty of lakes, rivers and marshlands, freshwater produce are used as major ingredients in the local cuisine. A key ingredient that is found within many Hubei-style dishes is the lotus root.

Style
Hubei cuisine emphasizes the preparation of ingredients and the matching of colors. It specializes in steaming techniques. Its style is influenced by the cooking methods of the cuisines of neighboring provinces such as Sichuan and Hunan. As a result, Hubei cuisine also uses dried hot pepper, black pepper and other spices to enhance the flavor of dishes.

Hubei cuisine comprises three distinct styles:
 Wuhan style specializes in soups as well as noodle dishes, such as hot dry noodles. Additionally, Wuhan is famous for its dry pots, which are similar to hot pot but without the soup base.
 Huangzhou style, which is more oily and tastes more salty than the others.
 Jingzhou style, which specializes in fish dishes and uses steaming as the primary method of cooking.
 Miao people style, which tastes thick, with the sour and hot most outstanding. It's in the southwest of Hubei province.

Signature dishes

Gallery

See also
 List of Chinese dishes

References

 
Regional cuisines of China